The 2016–17 Super League Greece was the 81st season of the highest tier in league of Greek football and the eleventh under its current title. The season started on 10 September 2016 and ended in June 2017. The league comprised fourteen teams from the 2015–16 season and two promoted from the 2015–16 Football League.

Teams
Two teams were relegated from the 2015–16 season. Panthrakikos and AEL Kalloni will play in Football League for the 2016–17 season.

Two teams were promoted from the 2015–16 Football League, champions AEL and Kerkyra.

Stadiums and locations

Personnel and kits

Note: Flags indicate national team as has been defined under FIFA eligibility rules. Players and Managers may hold more than one non-FIFA nationality.

Managerial changes

Regular season

League table

Postponement  
The Greek Super League was originally scheduled for 20 August 2016 but Greece's Sports minister Stavros Kontonis decided it would be postponed due to fears of violence.

The first match was then postponed and scheduled to be played on 10 September 2016 between Kerkyra and Platanias.

The match was a success and went ahead with no issues with Platanias winning 1–0.

On 9 November refereeing chief Giorgos Bikas was the victim of an arson attack, this led to Greek football of all divisions to be suspended.

Results

Positions by round

The table lists the positions of teams after each week of matches. In order to preserve chronological evolvements, any postponed matches are not included in the round at which they were originally scheduled, but added to the full round they were played immediately afterwards.

Play-offs
In the play-offs for Champions League and Europa League berths, the four qualified teams play each other in a home and away round robin. However, they do not all start with 0 points. Instead, a weighting system applies to the teams' standing at the start of the play-off mini-league. The team finishing fifth in the Super League will start the play-off with 0 points. The fifth placed team's end of season tally of points is subtracted from the sum of the points that other teams have. This number is then divided by five.

So, both AEK Athens and Panionios will begin the play-offs pointless. PAOK will enter the play-offs with two points, while Panathinaikos will have one point.

Season statistics
Updated to games played 30 April 2017

Top scorers

Top assists

Best goal and MVP awards winners

Awards

Annual awards
Annual awards were announced on 7 May 2017.

Player of the Year 

The Player of the Year awarded to  
 Marcus Berg (Panathinaikos)

Foreign Player of the Year 

The Foreign Player of the Year awarded to  Marcus Berg (Panathinaikos)

Top goalscorer of the Year

The Top goalscorer of the Year awarded to  Marcus Berg (Panathinaikos)

Greek Player of the Year

The Greek Player of the Year awarded to  Petros Mantalos (AEK Athens)

Manager of the Year 

The Manager of the Year awarded to  Vladimir Ivić (PAOK)

Breakthrough of the Year 

The Breakthrough of the Year awarded to  Panagiotis Retsos (Olympiacos)

Team of the Year 

Goalkeeper:
 Andreas Gianniotis (Panionios)
Defence:
 Léo Matos (PAOK),  Panagiotis Retsos (Olympiacos),  Rodrigo Moledo (Panathinaikos),  Leonardo Koutris (PAS Giannina)
Midfield:
 Masoud Shojaei (Panionios),  Carlos Zeca (Panathinaikos),  Kostas Fortounis (Olympiacos),  Manolis Siopis (Panionios),  Petros Mantalos (AEK Athens)
Attack:
 Marcus Berg (Panathinaikos)

Attendances
Average attendances counted officially without games played behind closed gates from Superleague.

References

External links
Official website 

Greece
1
A1 Ethniki
A1 Ethniki
2016-17